Pancha Tattva (Devanagari: पञ्चतत्त्व; IAST: pañca-tattva, from Sanskrit pañca meaning "five" and tattva "truth" or "reality") in the Gaudiya Vaishnava tradition of Hinduism refers specifically to the Five aspects of God or Absolute Truth.

Background
In Gaudiya Vaishnavism these five features of God (Krishna) are believed to have incarnated on Earth as five people in the late 15th century, Chaitanya Mahaprabhu, Nityananda, Advaita Acharya, Gadadhara Pandit and Srivasa Thakur. They famously spread the Krishna mantra and the practice of devotion (bhakti) towards Krishna throughout India.

The Five Features
 Śrī Caitanya Mahāprabhu is Kṛṣṇa Himself (Svayam Bhagavan).
 Śrī Nityānānda Rāma Prabhu is Kṛṣṇa's first personal expansion with the combined power of Balarama.
 Śrī Advaita Ācārya is the combined power of Śri Viṣṇu & Śri Śiva (Harihara).
 Śrī Śrīvāsa Thakura is Kṛṣṇa's pure devotee and symbolizes devotion (Bhakti).
 Śrī Gadadhāra Pandita is the combined power of Kṛṣṇa's internal energy (Śakti).

Pancha Tattva mantra
Within the Gaudiya tradition a mantra formed from the names of the five members of the Pancha Tattva is often spoken or sung as a means of devotional worship or japa. Often this mantra is sung or chanted prior to the Krishna mantra. It is believed by followers to be the most merciful mantra available in this age of Kali.

śrī-kṛṣṇa-caitanya prabhu-nityānanda,
śrī-advaita gadādhara śrīvāsādi-gaura-bhakta-vṛnda

An alternative version features another name for Chaitanya, "Gauranga":

śrī-gaurāṅga nityānānda, śrī-advaita-candra, 
gadādhara śrīvāsādi-gaura-bhakta-vṛnda

See also
 Bhakti Yoga
 Chaitanya Charitamrita
 Panchatattva (Tantra)
 Six Goswamis of Vrindavan
 Vaishnava

References

 Rosen, Steven J. Sri Pancha Tattva: The Five Features of God 1994  Folk Books, New York

Gaudiya religious leaders
Medieval Hindu religious leaders
Indian Hindu spiritual teachers
Vaishnavism
Bengali Hindus
People from West Bengal
16th-century Indian people